Chris Rodesch (born 18 July 2001) is a Luxembourgish tennis player.

Rodesch has a career high ATP singles ranking of 683 achieved on 08 August 2022. He also has a career high ATP doubles ranking of 790 achieved on 15 August 2022.

Rodesch represents Luxembourg at the Davis Cup, where he has a W/L record of 6–4.

Rodesch plays college tennis at the University of Virginia and won the 2022 NCAA Division I Men's Tennis Championships playing at position no. 1 for the Cavaliers.

Future and Challenger finals

Singles 2 (1–1)

Doubles 2 (2–0)

References

External links

2001 births
Living people
Luxembourgian male tennis players
Virginia Cavaliers men's tennis players